Putney Bridge is a Grade II listed bridge over the River Thames in west London, linking Putney on the south side with Fulham to the north. The bridge has medieval parish churches beside its abutments: St Mary's Church, Putney is built on the south and All Saints Church, Fulham on the north bank. This close proximity of two churches by a major river is rare, another example being at Goring-on-Thames and Streatley, villages hemmed in by the Chiltern Hills (the Goring Gap).  Before the first bridge was built in 1729, a ferry had shuttled between the two banks. 

The current format is three lanes southbound (including one bus lane) and one lane (plus cycle lane/bus stop) northbound. Putney High Street, a main approach, is part of a London hub for retail, offices, food, drink and entertainment.  Putney Embankment hosts Putney Pier for riverboat services immediately south-west of the bridge as well as the capital's largest set of facilities in rowing. The Pier in the sport marks one end of the Championship Course.

Position
The north side of the bridge is 120m west-southwest of Putney Bridge Underground station, which is in the park-sandwiched Hurlingham neighbourhood of Fulham. Parkland to the west includes the gardens of Fulham Palace, historic home of the Bishops of London. On the south side of the bridge are St Mary's Church and a rounded glass-prowed ship-shaped 21st-century building, Putney Wharf Tower, one of the tallest buildings in Putney.

History

First bridges

The first bridge of any kind between the two parishes of Fulham and Putney was built during the Civil War: after the Battle of Brentford in 1642, the Parliamentary forces built a bridge of boats between Fulham and Putney. According to an account from the period:The Lord-Generall hath caused a bridge to be built upon barges and lighters over the Thames, between Fulham and Putney, to convey his army and artillery over into Surry, to follow the King's forces; and he hath ordered that forts shall be erected at each end thereof to guard it; but for the present the seamen, with long boats and shallops, full of ordnance and musketeers, lie there upon the river to secure it.

The story runs that "in 1720 Sir Robert Walpole (the following year considered the first Prime Minister) was returning from seeing George I at Kingston on Thames and being in a hurry to get to the House of Commons rode together with his servant to Putney to take the ferry across to Fulham. The ferry boat was on the opposite side, however and the waterman, who was drinking in The Swan, ignored the calls of Sir Robert and his servant and they were obliged to take another route." Walpole vowed that a bridge would replace the ferry.

The then Prince of Wales equally "was often inconvenienced by the ferry when returning from hunting in Richmond Park and asked Walpole to use his influence by supporting the bridge."

The legal framework for construction of a bridge was approved by an Act of Parliament (the Fulham and Putney Bridge Act) in 1726. Built by local master carpenter Thomas Phillips to a design by Royal Navy Surveyor Sir Jacob Ackworth, the first bridge was opened on 29 November 1729. In its first guise, from 1729 to 1886 it was slightly downriver to the north, and in many official records was also known as Fulham Bridge. It was the only bridge between London Bridge and Kingston Bridge at the time. It was a toll bridge with tollbooths at either end of the timber-built structure.

In October 1795, Mary Wollstonecraft, philosopher and early women's equality advocate, allegedly planned to commit suicide by jumping from the bridge, because she had returned from a trip to Sweden to discover that her lover was involved with an actress from London.

The bridge was the starting point for The Boat Race from 1845 until the new iron aqueduct was built just upstream in 1856, after which this became the starting point. The competitors are currently 32 men of the universities of Oxford and Cambridge with two crews of first and second eights. Women's eights competed in an equivalent race for the first time in 2015, having since 1927 competed a shorter varsity race in Henley also in the early spring.

The bridge was badly damaged by the collision of a river barge in 1870. Although part of the bridge was subsequently replaced, the entire bridge was then demolished to make way for construction of the current bridge. The iron aqueduct was also demolished as the new bridge carried the water in pipes beneath the road surface.

Current bridge

The Metropolitan Board of Works purchased the bridge in 1879, discontinued the tolls in 1880, and set about its replacement. 

In 1886 construction of the stone bridge that stands today, on a new alignment, was completed. A new road – Putney Bridge Approach – was laid to connect the northern end of the new bridge with Fulham High Street at its junction with New King's Road; in consequence the southernmost stretch of Fulham High Street was reduced to a cul-de-sac. The bridge was designed by civil engineer Sir Joseph Bazalgette as a five-span structure, built of stone and Cornish granite. Bazalgette also designed London's sewerage system, and the bridge integrates two of his five outfall sewers running perpendicular to it. It was constructed by John Waddell of Edinburgh, whose tender of £240,433 was accepted on 15 April 1882. In 1933, the bridge was widened to its present three carriageways. Putney Bridge Approach was widened in consequence, further encroaching on the churchyard of All Saints Church, Fulham.

The stone marking the downstream end of the Championship Course is used for all boat races through Putney in Olympic-class rowing boats. These include the Wingfield Sculls and the UK's main Head of the River Races, just west of the bridge, rather than at the bridge itself, under which the centre of its middle arch would provide an advantage if starting underneath it, as all races are competed with the tide.

In 2007, the bridge suffered considerable damage by a developer who cut several holes into the Cornish granite of the southern approach of the bridge.

On 14 July 2014, Putney Bridge closed for three months, except to pedestrians and dismounted cyclists, to undergo "essential repairs" by Wandsworth Council "to better protect the bridge from damage caused by water penetration, which has contributed to the poor road surface". The bridge reopened on 26 September that year.

On 5 May 2017 an unidentified jogger on the bridge pushed over a woman, where an approaching bus narrowly avoided hitting her. Irish playwright Sonya Kelly wrote a play, Once Upon a Bridge,  inspired by the incident which was produced by Druid Theatre in 2021.

See also 
Crossings of the River Thames
Putney Bridge tube station
List of bridges in London

References

External links
 

 
1729 establishments in England
Bridges across the River Thames
Bridges completed in 1886
Former toll bridges in England
Fulham
Grade II listed bridges in London
Grade II listed buildings in the London Borough of Hammersmith and Fulham
Grade II listed buildings in the London Borough of Wandsworth
History of the London Borough of Hammersmith and Fulham
Putney
Transport in the London Borough of Hammersmith and Fulham
Transport in the London Borough of Wandsworth